Pretty Ladies is the name archaeologists gave to pre-Columbian female figurines in Mexico, from the Chupícuaro, Michoacan, and Tlatilco cultures at the beginning of the 20th century.

Archaeological research and context 
The figurines were found in archaeological research at the beginning of the 1930s by Mexican and American archaeologists. It is in fact the discovery of the figurines that led to the discovery of whole sites, like the Tlatlico one.

There are many interpretations of what were the function of the figures. In some configurations, they were buried with dead bodies to ensure the resurrection of the corpses. They also represented fertility, not necessarily human fertility but also earth fertility.

Descriptions 

These figurines were described in different ways, highlighting different aspects:
"females with large heads, small waists, and prominent hips".
"naked female with short arms, extended stomach and a fancy coiffure or headdress"

Naming problematics 

These figures are also called by archaeologists "naked feminine figures", "nude girls", "topless girls and women" or even "Venus of (Tlatlico, for instance)", which at least one scholar claimed is problematic because in doing so, they projected ideals on the culture these figures were part of, influenced by European representations of beauty.

Also, the naming of clay figures was done in a different way for female and male representations. The equivalent male figures were never called "pretty lords" or "nude men", even when they were as naked as the female figures, but rather "man", "male figure", "chief", etc.

See also 
Tlatilco
Mexican ceramics
Royal Museums of Art and History

Notes

References 
 Woman And Art in Early Modern Latin America, Kellen Kee MacIntyre, Richard E. Phillips (eds.), 1996.
 Findley, Sheila A. 1997. Not Just Pretty Ladies: An Analysis of Anthropomorphic Clay Figurines from the Preclassic Site of Chupícuaro, Guanajuato, Mexico. Unpublished Master's Thesis, Departement of Anthropology, University of California, Los Angeles.

Mexican art
Ceramic art
Indigenous ceramics of the Americas
Women in art